Foundation for a Drug-Free World (FDFW) is a nonprofit organization based in Los Angeles, California, with a focus on the elimination of drug and alcohol abuse and its resulting criminality. Founded in October 2006, it is supported by the Church of Scientology. There has been controversy about the claims made by the foundation and about its support by public organizations who were not aware of its link to Scientology.
The Foundation uses the self-produced Truth About Drugs campaign materials for drug education and has been described as "discredited pseudoscience" and without "pharmacological basis" by health care professionals.
The program has been accused of scaremongering by health care professionals, for claims such as cocaine withdrawal can cause severe depression which can lead to the addict committing murder.

Relation to Scientology and Narconon
In 2012, the police department of Santa Ana distributed anti-drug pamphlets provided by the Foundation for a Drug-Free World.  A reporter called the contact number on the pamphlets and asked where to get help for drug abuse.  He was directed to Narconon Arrowhead, the flagship rehab centre of Narconon International, which is classified as a Scientology related entity by the IRS. The SAPD withdrew the pamphlets after the reported link.

The "Drug-Free Marshal" program started in November, 2008, at Las Cruces, New Mexico.  The Foundation for a Drug-Free World supplied the pamphlets, at the bottom of which contained a notice of copyright by Foundation for a Drug-Free World, Narconon and Association for Better Living and Education, all programs sponsored by the Church of Scientology. After the city mayor found out that the anti-drug program was created and bankrolled by the Church of Scientology, he apologized and ended the program.

After an investigation by the State of California into the Narconon anti-drug education program, State Superintendent Jack O'Connell urged all California schools to drop the program for its inaccurate and unscientific information in 2005, the year before the Foundation for a Drug-Free World was founded.

In 2017 in Santa Monica High School after a pupil's LSD related death, the foundation presented seminars to pupils in school but when made aware of the connection to the Church of Scientology a number of parents complained and the program was halted. The church responded publicly in a press statement and accused Santa Monica High School of bigotry and religious discrimination.

References

External links
 

Addiction organizations in the United States
Scientology organizations
Drug policy organizations based in the United States